The Old National Events Plaza (formerly The Centre) is a  convention center and auditorium in Evansville, Indiana, United States, that consists of a 2,500-seat auditorium, a  exhibit hall,  ballroom, and 12 flexible  meeting rooms.

The facility hosts small and medium-sized conventions ranging from 20 to 4,000 people. The auditorium is also frequently the site a variety of concerts and special events. Formerly known as Vanderburgh Auditorium, the building underwent a major renovation and expansion in the mid-1990s and was renamed the centre.  The architects involved with the project included HOK Venue and Veazey Parrot & Shoulders.

It is co-managed with the Ford Center, Mesker Amphitheatre, and Victory Theatre.

References

External links
 The Centre Website
 The current Old National Events Plaza Website

Buildings and structures in Evansville, Indiana
Convention centers in Indiana
Theatres in Indiana
Music venues in Indiana
Tourist attractions in Evansville, Indiana